The 1949 Wimbledon Championships took place on the outdoor grass courts at the All England Lawn Tennis and Criquet Club in Wimbledon, London, United Kingdom. The tournament was held from Monday 20 June until Saturday 2 July. It was the 63rd staging of the Wimbledon Championships, and the third Grand Slam  of Year. Ted Schroeder and Louise Brough won the singles titles.

A record 25,000 spectores attended the opening day of the championships. Centre Court was fully restored and renovated for the championships in 1949, having suffered bomb damage during The Blitz in the Second World War. Women officiated as lines judges on Centre Court for the first time in 1949. The Men's Singles champion received the winners' trophy on Centre Court for the first time.

Finals

Seniors

Men's singles

 Ted Schroeder defeated  Jaroslav Drobný, 3–6, 6–0, 6–3, 4–6, 6–4

Women's singles

 Louise Brough defeated  Margaret duPont, 10–8, 1–6, 10–8

Men's doubles

 Pancho Gonzales /  Frank Parker defeated  Gardnar Mulloy /  Ted Schroeder, 6–4, 6–4, 6–2

Women's doubles

 Louise Brough /  Margaret duPont defeated  Gussie Moran /  Pat Todd, 8–6, 7–5

Mixed doubles

 Eric Sturgess /  Sheila Summers defeated  John Bromwich /  Louise Brough, 9–7, 9–11, 7–5

Juniors

Boys' singles

 Staffan Stockenberg defeated  John Horn, 6–2, 6–1

Girls' singles

 Christiane Mercelis defeated  Susan Partridge, 6–4, 6–2

References

External links
 Official Wimbledon Championships website

 
Wimbledon Championships
Wimbledon Championships
Wimbledon Championships
Wimbledon Championships